The 1991 430 km of Suzuka was the opening round of the 1991 World Sportscar Championship season, taking place at Suzuka Circuit, Japan.  It took place on April 14, 1991.

Official results
Class winners in bold.  Cars failing to complete 90% of the winner's distance marked as Not Classified (NC).

† - #16 Repsol Brun Motorsport was disqualified for using more than its allowed usage of fuel.

Statistics
 Pole Position - Derek Warwick (#3 Silk Cut Jaguar) - 1:48.084
 Fastest Lap - Derek Warwick (#3 Silk Cut Jaguar) - 1:49.148
 Average Speed - 176.031 km/h

External links
 WSPR-Racing - 1991 Suzuka results

Suzuka
Suzuka